The Best of the Early Country Gentlemen is a compilation album by the progressive bluegrass band Country Gentlemen.

Track listing

 Young Fisherwoman
 Bluebirds Are Singing For Me
 I Am Weary, 
 Heartaches
 Lonesome Day 
 Katie Dear
 This Morning At Nine
 500 Miles 
 Copper Kettle
 The Gentleman Is Blue
 Can't You Hear Me Callin'
 You Left Me Alone

Personnel
 Charlie Waller - guitar, vocals
 John Duffey - mandolin, vocals
 Eddie Adcock - banjo, vocals
 Tom Gray - bass, vocals

References

External links
 https://web.archive.org/web/20091215090142/http://www.lpdiscography.com/c/Cgentlemen/cgent.htm

1971 greatest hits albums
The Country Gentlemen compilation albums
Rebel Records compilation albums
Albums produced by Charlie Waller (American musician)
Albums produced by John Duffey
Albums produced by Tom Gray
Albums produced by Eddie Adcock